The 1939–40 Ohio Bobcats men's basketball team represented Ohio University. Dutch Trautwein was the head coach for Ohio. The Bobcats played their home games at the Men's Gymnasium.  They finished the season 19–6

Schedule

|-
!colspan=9 style=| Regular Season

Source:

References

Ohio Bobcats men's basketball seasons
Ohio
Ohio Bobcats
Ohio Bobcats